Jörgen is a town in Austria.

Jörgen, a Scandinavian name for George, may also refer to:

A
Jörgen Augustsson

B
Jörgen Bemström
Jörgen Brink

D
Jörgen Dafgård

E
Jörgen Elofsson
Jörgen Ericsson

H
Jörgen Hammergaard Hansen
Jörgen Hellman (born 1963), Swedish politician
Jörgen Holmquist

J
Jörgen Johansson
Jörgen Jönsson

K
Jörgen Kruth

L
Jörgen Lehmann
Jörgen Liik
Jörgen Lindegaard

M
Jörgen Mårtensson
Jörgen Möller

O
Jörgen Olsson (disambiguation)

S
Jörgen Nilsen Schaumann

P
Jörgen Persson
Jörgen Pettersson (disambiguation)

R
Jörgen Skafte Rasmussen
Jörgen van Rijen

S
Jörgen Sandström
Jörgen Strand
Jörgen Sundelin
Jörgen Sundeqvist

W
Jörgen Wålemark

Z
Jörgen Zoega

See also
Jørgen

Swedish masculine given names